Tom Hodges (born January 1, 1982) is an American college basketball coach and the former head coach of the women's basketball program at Morehead State University in Morehead, Kentucky. The Morehead State Eagles are members of the Ohio Valley Conference and compete in the NCAA's Division I. Hodges contract was not renewed after four seasons. He had previously been an assistant at Middle Tennessee State, from 2005 to 2010, then had a second stint with the Blue Raiders from 2014 to 2018, when he resigned to join the family business - Titan Transfer and Goggin Warehousing.

Head coaching record

References

1982 births
Living people
American women's basketball coaches
Morehead State Eagles women's basketball coaches